Marat Kurbanaliyevich Adzhiniyazov (born 1 March 1991) is a Kyrgyzstani footballer who is a defence player of Abdish-Ata. He is a member of the Kyrgyzstan national football team.
Previously, he played for Neftchi Kochkor-Ata.

Career
On 31 July 2017, Adzhiniyazov moved to Neftchi Kochkor-Ata after Dordoi agreed to mutual terminate his contract.

Career statistics

International

Statistics accurate as of match played 5 September 2014

References

1991 births
Living people
Kyrgyzstani footballers
Kyrgyzstan international footballers
Association football defenders
Footballers at the 2014 Asian Games
Asian Games competitors for Kyrgyzstan